Jonas Geirnaert (born July 28, 1982) studied animation at the KASK in Ghent. In May 2004 he won the Short Film Jury Prize at the Cannes Film Festival with his animated short Flatlife (11 min). Of the copy he sent in for selection only the first minute had sound. This is because this was his graduation project, and it wasn't completely finished at the final date for selection entries.

Although Flatlife has no political message, Jonas' previous movie, The All-American Alphabet, clearly has one. On stage in Cannes, Jonas had a message for all Americans: "Don't vote Bush". At that moment such statements were very popular, however his political preference has to be situated in the extreme-left corner as he is a militant for the marxist party Workers Party of Belgium.

In the fall of 2005 Geirnaert made the TV comedy series Neveneffecten for Canvas (public Flemish television) with his fellow comedians Lieven Scheire, Koen De Poorter and Jelle De Beule. In 2011 this same group of four made the television show BASTA which also offered satirical critique on current cultural phenomenon, like help desks, uncritical journalism, television call games, the production of meat and internet scammers. Through their actions some of the more fraudulent abuses have been put to a stop, e.g. the de facto illegal television calling games have been banned from television in Flanders.

Filmography
Basta (2011)
Kabouter Wesley (2009)
Willy's en marjetten (2006)
Neveneffecten (2005)
Flatlife (2004)
The All-American Alphabet (2002)

References

External links
Kabouter Wesley
Official Site

Neveneffecten

1982 births
Living people
Belgian film directors
Belgian animated film directors
Belgian television directors
Belgian animators
Belgian comics artists
Belgian male actors
Belgian male comedians
Belgian television presenters
Belgian surrealist artists
People from Wachtebeke